Joseph-Alphonse-Omer de Valbelle (1729–1818) was a French aristocrat and military officer.

Biography

Early life
Joseph-Alphonse-Omer de Valbelle was born on 18 June 1729 in Aix-en-Provence. His father was André Geoffroy de Valbelle and his mother, Marguerite-Delphine de Valbelle. He had a brother, Joseph-Ignage-Cosme de Valbelle, and a sister, Anne Alphonsine de Valbelle.

Career
He served as a mestre de camp in 1749, maréchal de camp in 1762, followed by Lieutenant general of Provence.

After his brother's death in 1766, he inherited the marquisates of Tourves, Rians, Montfuron, Bressuire, the Baronetcies of Saint-Symphorien-sur-Coise and Meyrargues, the Countom of Oraison, Valbelle, Sainte-Tulles, Cadarache, Rougiers, Venelles, Peyrolles-en-Provence, Mousteyret, Levens, Reveste, Cucuron, etc.

Personal life
He resided in a hôtel particulier on the Rue du Bac in Paris. He also resided at the family Hôtel de Valbelle in Aix-en-Provence. Additionally, he resided at the family castle, Château des Valbelles in Tourves. He had an affair with La Clairon (1723–1803) and bequeathed her 4,000 French livres after his death.

He died of apoplexy on 18 November 1818 in Paris. He was buried in the Chartreuse de Montrieux, a monastery in Méounes-lès-Montrieux.

References

1729 births
1818 deaths
People from Aix-en-Provence
Military personnel from Paris
Provencal nobility